Thomas P. Farley is an American manners expert known in the media as "Mister Manners." He is also a keynote speaker and workshop leader, a radio and television personality and a journalist.

As a commentator on subjects of contemporary behavior, Farley is a frequent guest on NBC's Today Show, among other media outlets, including the Rachael Ray show and Inside Edition, where he addresses topics such as "How to Navigate Awkward Interactions" and "How to Get Along at the Office." He also runs a consulting company called What Manners Most, which works with corporations to elevate the level of professionalism and courtesy in their operations. Among the programs he offers include series on customer service,  business etiquette and business communication.

Starting in spring 2020, in direct response to the COVID-19 pandemic, he launched a syndicated column with the Tribune Content Agency called "Ask Mister Manners." It was also during the pandemic that he unveiled the What Manners Most podcast.

At the end of 2021, Farley introduced a slate of programming designed specifically for companies looking to ease their teams' transition back to the office after nearly two years of remote work. This curriculum, called "2022: The Year We Bounce Back," deals with RTO (return to office); hybrid work environments; managing remote teams; and how to be one's best virtual self when on videoconferencing platforms such as Zoom and Microsoft Teams.

Mister Manners 

It was during his near-decade-long tenure at Town & Country (2000-2008), that Farley first became known to national and New York television audiences as an expert on issues of better behavior, appearing on CNN, ABC, NBC, CBS and in periodicals such as The New York Times and New York magazine.

During his time at Town & Country, he was the editor of T&C'''s "On the Town" and "Social Graces" columns. While still at the magazine, he edited the anthology Modern Manners: The Thinking Person's Guide to Social Graces, a guide to mannerly living that includes essays by Peggy Noonan, Frank McCourt and Jamie Lee Curtis.

Throughout 2011, Farley served as a guest host for Living Today, a three-hour program that aired live daily on the Martha Stewart Living Radio network on Sirius XM 110, satellite radio, introducing, among other ideas, a segment called "Manners Mondays."

In 2017, as a special correspondent for the Today Show, Farley reported for the series "Manners on the Move," which looked at specific areas of incivility in America. The series aired during that year's May sweeps. 

From the onset of the pandemic, he has served as a regular on-camera resource for networks seeking to provide their viewers with insights into how to interact safely and considerately in an age of social distancing. He has been quoted as saying: "In the early days of this battle, long before we had a single vaccine, our most effective deterrents to COVID-19 were common courtesy and consideration—the twin tenets of good etiquette."

He promotes both ideals regularly in his aforementioned syndicated column, which appears in the Chicago Tribune, New York Daily News, Baltimore Sun, and the Sun Sentinel among other national newspapers. He also covers these topics in the "What Manners Most" podcast, which examines the cultural ramifications of the pandemic and the effects it has had on the way individuals interact.

 Other work 

In addition to his media commentating, Farley leads workshops for corporations and universities, promoting the concept of considerate communication—a level of professionalism that balances the demands of modern workplace culture with an embrace of diversity, equity and inclusion. Among his clients have included Estée Lauder Companies, Wells Fargo, JPMorgan Chase, the American Automobile Association, the American Express and Viacom.

As the former host of New York Insider TV and Citybuzz, the latter of which was seen in-flight on JetBlue, Farley remains a frequent and popular personality on the New York social scene and has interviewed dozens of prominent celebrities, including Mike Myers, Sarah Jessica Parker, Snoop Dogg, Ivanka Trump, Andie MacDowell, Sean Connery, Jessica Biel, Joan Rivers, NYC Mayor Michael Bloomberg, Jimmy Fallon Sarah, Duchess of York and Jon Bon Jovi. He is also a regular fixture on the foodie circuit, where he has interviewed everyone from Guy Fieri to Rocco DiSpirito and from Rachael Ray to Emeril Lagasse.

 Writing 

As a journalist, among the major feature stories Farley has written during his career include the tale of a cruise to Antarctica; a first-person account of flying with the Blue Angels; and reportage from volcano-ravaged Montserrat, in the West Indies. (Shortly after he and his photographer left, the island's airport was permanently closed, due to a pyroclastic flow that destroyed the runway). 
 
Farley edited Modern Manners: The Thinking Person's Guide to Social Graces, published in 2005, and is a featured contributor to the collection The Experts' Guide to Doing Things Faster: 100 Ways to Make Life More Efficient,'' published by Clarkson Potter, in 2008.

Affiliations 

Farley is founder of the Experts Collective, a group of like-minded lifestyle experts that also includes digital lifestyle guru Mario Armstrong, animal lifestyle expert Wendy Diamond and dating and relationships expert Andrea Syrtash, among several others.

References

External links
What Manners Most
You Shouldn't Go Off the Railings "New York Post" newspaper; December 6, 2012.
Share and Share Alike "New York Post" newspaper; February 14, 2013.

Living people
Etiquette writers
American male writers
Year of birth missing (living people)